John Thomas Blake (4 April 1853–26 November 1940) was a New Zealand  surveyor, interpreter, land agent, historian, racehorse owner and trainer. Of Māori descent, he identified with the Taranaki iwi. He was born in Auckland, Auckland, New Zealand on 4 April 1853.

References

1853 births
1940 deaths
Interpreters
New Zealand surveyors
20th-century New Zealand historians
Taranaki (iwi)
New Zealand racehorse owners and breeders
Writers from Auckland
New Zealand Māori public servants
19th-century New Zealand historians